Adebayo Alonge is a Nigerian pharmacist, inventor, deep tech entrepreneur, and market development professional. He is the winner of the 2019 Hello Tomorrow Global Deeptech Challenge, known as the BNP Paribas Group Deep Tech Award, for creating a handheld nano scanner that detects counterfeit drugs. He was the first African to ever win the contest.

He is the CEO and co-founder of RxAll Inc. – a U.S based deep tech start-up firm.

Education
Adebayo Alonge attended King's College, Lagos, between 1996–2002. He studied pharmacy at University of Ibadan, and graduated with first class honor in 2008. He had a Master of Business Administration degree (with focus on Strategy and Finance) from the Lagos Business School - Pan-Atlantic University and holds a Master of Advanced Management from Yale University - Yale School of Management. He is an alumnus of Hitotsubashi University Graduate School of International Corporate Strategy, and currently studying Master of Public Administration (Mason Program) at Harvard Kennedy School - Harvard University.

Career
Adebayo Alonge served in the following capacity as a Medical representative of Sanofi between November 2009 and September 2010, as well as a Contract Pharmacist at Global HIV/AIDS Initiative. He worked as a Medical representative of Roche (currently Swiss Pharma Nigeria) from September 2010 to October 2012, and as a Market Development Intern(Pharma Ingredients) of BASF, a German chemical company where he worked from July 2013 to October 2013. He worked as a Market Developer at BASF West Africa from August 2014 to August 2015 as well, and he was a Director of business development at “Lusoy Investments Limited” between April 2012 to October 2017 and during November 2015 to October 2017 he worked as a Consultant at The Boston Consulting Group.

In 2016, Alonge co-founded RxAll Inc. intending to prevent patients from counterfeit medicines and provide a way for them to authenticate their drugs. RxAll. Inc has three co-founders, Alonge as the Chief executive official, Amy Kao as the chief marketing officer, and Wei Liu as the chief technology officer.

Awards, honours and recognition
Adebayo Alonge is the recipient of the following awards, Adekunle Ajasin Award for Academic Excellence in 2008,  Mandela Washington Fellowship from the United States Department of State for outstanding contributions to business and entrepreneurship in Africa in 2014, the Global Social Venture Award in 2016 from InnovateHealth, Yale. Adebayo Alonge won the 2018 China Award for Best DeepTech Platform in the World, he also got a €100,000 prize for a DeepTech award. Some of the other things he won were the Grand Winner & Digital Health Winner in 2019, the Hello Tomorrow Global Challenge 2019, the Young Innovator – YouWin!, the Regional finalist, Hult Prize Global Case Competition and awards in person from Barack Obama (ex-president of the United States) and Justin Trudeau (prime minister of Canada).

External links
Lagos Business School Official Website.
Yale School Of Management Official Website.
International Federation of Pharmaceutical Manufacturers and Associations Official Website.
IREX Organization Official Website.
TechSause Official Website.
Biographical Legacy and Research Foundation of Nigeria Official website.
Adebayo Alonge Website.

References

Living people
Nigerian inventors
Nigerian pharmacists
Harvard Kennedy School alumni
Hitotsubashi University alumni
Yale School of Management alumni
Lagos Business School alumni
University of Ibadan alumni
Nigerian computer scientists
Nigerian business executives
Nigerian company founders
Nigerian emigrants to the United States
People from Lagos State
Year of birth missing (living people)